Ferenc Bihar de Barabásszeg (20 December 1847 – 17 May 1920) was a Hungarian military officer and politician, who served as Minister of Defence between 1905 and 1906, during the Hungarian Constitutional Crisis of 1905. After the fall of the cabinet of Géza Fejérváry he retired.

References
 Magyar Életrajzi Lexikon

1847 births
1920 deaths
People from Debrecen
Hungarian soldiers
Defence ministers of Hungary
Theresian Military Academy alumni